Chiniot District (Punjabi and ), is a district in the Punjab province of Pakistan. It became the district in February 2009. Before this, it was a tehsil of Jhang District.

History 
Chiniot region was an agricultural region with forests during the Indus Valley civilization. The Vedic period is characterized by Indo-Aryan culture that migrated from Central Asia and settled in Punjab region. The Kambojas, Daradas, Kaikayas, Madras, Pauravas, Yaudheyas, Malavas and Kurus invaded, settled and ruled ancient Punjab region. After overrunning the Achaemenid Empire in 331 BCE, Alexander marched into present-day Punjab region with an army of 50,000. The Chiniot region was ruled by Maurya Empire, Indo-Greek kingdom, Kushan Empire, Gupta Empire, White Huns, Kushano-Hephthalites and Shahi kingdoms.

In 997 CE, Sultan Mahmud Ghaznavi, took over the Ghaznavid dynasty empire established by his father, Sultan Sebuktegin. In 1005, he conquered the Shahis in Kabul in 1005, and followed it by the conquests of Punjab region. The Delhi Sultanate and later Mughal Empire ruled the region. The Punjab region became predominantly Muslim due to missionary Sufi saints whose dargahs dot the landscape of Punjab region.

After the decline of the Mughal Empire, the Sikh Empire conquered Narowal District. The Muslims faced restrictions during the Sikh rule. The British took over Chiniot District in 1848.

The predominantly Muslim population supported Muslim League and Pakistan Movement.  After the independence of Pakistan in 1947, the minority Hindus and Sikhs migrated to India while the Muslim refugees from India settled in the Chiniot District.

"Chiniot" name is from Chandan Khan (sister of Malik Machchhe Khan), Raja of Chiniot, a Khokhar rajput clan. Mari tappa (founded by the rajput Raja Badal Khan Khokhar) was not then populated, but Andheri was flourishing, and north of it lay the Dhaular, or abode of Rani Chandan, which was called Chandniot, now Chiniot. Or some say its name is based on as, literally "OT" (Behind/Across) of "CHIN-ab river", hence Chiniot. According to Sir Denzil Ibbetson. Panjab Castes, A glossary of tribes and castes of Punjab by H.D. ROSE. Chiniot was known for its master crafted furniture, not only in Pakistan, but all over the world. Its highly special and master craft Jharokhas are known in the whole country.

On 2 February 2009, Chief Minister Shahbaz Sharif formally approved the creation of Chiniot as the 36th district of Punjab province on behalf of MPA IMTIAZ AHMAD LALI & Molana Ilyas Ahmed Chinioti. Calls for Chiniot to be made a district date back to 2005, when a movement was a launched to elevate the former tehsil to district level. The movement died down when the public were assured the next Nazim would be from Chiniot – however this was not to be the case.

Rana Tahir - the maiden DCO Chiniot along with Mr Hamza Shahbaz Sharif, raised the flag of Pakistan on DCO office on the fine morning of 1 July 2009.  The efforts of Rana Tahir in giving a proper developed outlook to the infant district will find a place in history and cannot be overemphasized.  Mr Dilmeir Khan appointed as first district accounts officer and Mr Fayaz Sunbal was appointed as First DPO Chiniot.

Demographics
At the time of the 2017 census the district had a population of 1,368,659, of which 699,606 were males and 668,914 females. Rural population is 946,429 while the urban population is 422,230. The literacy rate was 50.05%. Muslims were the predominant religious community with 95.47% of the population while Ahmadiyya, officially counted as non-Muslims by the Pakistani state, were 4.37% of the population.

At the time of the 2017 census, 94.62% of the population spoke Punjabi, 3.85% Urdu and other 1.16% as their first language.

Fauna and flora 
The fauna and flora of the district include: Jand trees (Prosopis spicigera), Karir (Capparis aphylla), Beri (Ziziphus jujuba), Van (Salvadora abeoides), Kikar (Acacia arabica), Shisham (Dalbergia ) and Aak (Calotropis hamiltoni) are found within the district.

Architecture 
The Omar Hayat Mahal (also known as Gulzar Manzil), is a 19th-century palace in Chiniot.
(Badshahi Masjid) it was built by Nawab Saad Ullah Khan who was minister of Shah Jahan. It has same architecture as Shahi Masjid Lahore.  Nawab Saad Ullah was minister in the cabinet of the Mughal Empire.

Important Village:
Bhowana is one of the most famous towns of Chiniot District due to its ability to produce many Civil Service of Pakistan officers.

See also

 Chiniot
 Faisalabad Division
 Chiniot railway station
 Chenab College, Chiniot
 Districts of Pakistan
 Punjab, Pakistan
 Sangla Hill–Kundian Branch Line

References

External links 

 
Districts of Punjab, Pakistan